Body spray is a perfume product, similar to aerosol deodorant, which is intended to be used elsewhere on the body besides the armpits. Body sprays are lighter in strength than cologne, generally less expensive, and double as deodorant.

Common ingredients
Some common ingredients found in body spray include: butane, isobutane, propane, alcohol, parfum.

Major brands
Some well known body spray brands include Unilever's "Axe" and "Impulse", Gillette's "Tag", Dial's "RGX", Procter & Gamble's "Old Spice".

References

Perfumes